Máximo González and Nicolás Jarry were the defending champions, but Jarry could not compete due to a provisional suspension. González played alongside Fabrice Martin but lost in the quarterfinals to Marcel Granollers and Horacio Zeballos.

Granollers and Zeballos went on to win the title, defeating Salvatore Caruso and Federico Gaio in the final, 6–4, 5–7, [10–7].

Seeds

Draw

Draw

Qualifying

Seeds

Qualifiers
  Salvatore Caruso /  Federico Gaio

Lucky losers
  Attila Balázs /  Fernando Romboli

Qualifying draw

References

External Links
 Main draw
 Qualifying draw

Rio Open - Doubles
Rio
Rio Open